Vanessa King (born September 19, 1980) is a Canadian actress from Coquitlam, British Columbia, known for her role as Anika in the television series Edgemont, a role for which she was nominated in the category Best Performance in a Children's or Youth Program or Series for the Gemini Awards in 2001, a Leo Awards 'Best Performance' nomination in 2002 and a Leo Awards win in 2003.

Recognition
As an eleven-year-old actress, previously having acted only in two commercials, she received acclaim for her starring role in the 1993 TV movie Liar, Liar, including a Gemini Award nomination in the category Best Performance by an Actress in a Leading Role in a Dramatic Program or Mini-series. She plays a troubled girl who accuses her father of sexually abusing her. Tom Barrett of The Vancouver Sun wrote that King's performance "is remarkable, showing a poise and subtlety beyond the range of most child actors." Critic Ray Loynd of the Los Angeles Times wrote that the role was "very well played ... in a believably spiteful, hateful way". John Haslett Cuff of The Globe and Mail wrote that she "so effectively captures the confusion and rebelliousness of the young girl that viewers' doubts about her story are genuine from the beginning." The Austin American-Statesman stated, "The acting is low-key and honest, with young King turning in a powerful performance as the enigmatic child." Critic Victor Dwyer, writing in Maclean's, said that King "does a convincing job as Kelley, portraying the young girl as equal parts crafty and oddly naive, her measured performance giving nothing away." The Toronto Star's TV critic, Greg Quill, called King's performance "a stunning debut".

Filmography

Film

Television

Awards and nominations

References

External links
 

1980 births
Living people
People from Coquitlam
Canadian film actresses
Actresses from British Columbia
Canadian television actresses